This article lists internationally distributed films that:
 were shot on location in the city of Baku, capital of Azerbaijan;
 use the city of Baku as a set to portray other cities;
 have the story or part of the story set in Baku, but were not shot there;
 if they are animated films, they have Baku as their identifiable venue.

Films and television series

Amphibian Man
Balaxanı-Sabunçu polis idarəsi süvari qorodovoyların at oynatmaları
The Diamond Arm
Dolu
In the kingdom of oil and millions
The Life of Bakuvians and Their Movement Along the Velikokniaz Avenue
Oil Extraction
The Oil Gush Fire in Bibiheybat
The Oil Gush in Balakhany
Train Entering the Railroad Station
The Twelve Chairs (1971 film)
Teheran 43
Try Not to Breathe
Work at Oil Derricks
The World Is Not Enough
Xoca
 Ali and Nino (film)
The Gray Man (2022 film)
Layla Majnun (film) 

Films
Films
Baku